Al-Musayyib is a district in Babil Governorate, Iraq.  It is centred on the town of Al Musayyib.

Cities
Al Musayyib 
Jurf Al Sakhar

References

Districts of Babil Governorate